Bill Zebub is the  manager of Bill Zebub Productions. His production company publishes a quarterly magazine titled The Grimoire of Exalted Deeds, mainly about death metal music and independent movies.  He has made an array of low-budget films, and also is the host of a radio show on WFMU in the New Jersey area. He hosts the show under the alias 'Professor Dum Dum'. His stage name is a pun on the Hebrew demon, named Beelzebub.

The Grimoire of Exalted Deeds
The Grimoire of Exalted Deeds is a metal magazine published by Bill Zebub. Each issue consists of interviews with metal bands, CD and DVD reviews. The interviews are generally comedic with a sarcastic nature. The magazine contains non-pornographic nudity, and is available in print and on-line.

It was originally published starting in 1991 as a photocopied fanzine, and as the magazine grew more popular within the heavy metal community, it was later published with a glossy cover. By 1997, the magazine had become so well received among metal audiences that it was chosen as the official magazine and program of the Milwaukee Metalfest. It is now published approximately quarterly, in an all-glossy format.

The magazine features often humorous interviews of various heavy metal musicians, which Bill Zebub frequently conducts in Elizabethan English, for comedic effect. Occasionally, the magazine offers brief fiction pieces, and articles on various subjects relating to fantasy or mysticism. Criticism of organized religion, particularly Christianity, is another recurring topic. The magazine also includes a feature called "Grimoire Girls", female Metal fans who voluntarily submit photographs of themselves, some in varying states of undress. The style of humor in the magazine is brutally sarcastic, and is intentionally politically incorrect.

Professor Dum Dum's Lab
Bill Zebub has a weekly radio show on 91.1 FM WFMU, airing Monday nights at midnight until 3 am Tuesday morning Eastern time.  Zebub plays the character 'Professor Dum Dum: Scientist of Music and Human Behavior' who hails from Germany. The Professor plays heavy metal music and discusses topics with callers.

Filmography
Metalheads (2001)
Dirtbags: The Armpit of Metal (2002)
Death metal: A Documentary (2002)
Metal Radio KCUF (2003)
Skits-O-Phrenia (2003)
Jesus Christ: Serial Rapist (2003)
Kill the Scream Queen (2004)
The Crucifier (2004)
The Worst Horror Movie Ever Made (2005)
Bad Acid (2005)
Rape is a Circle (2006)
Girls of Bill Zebub's Movies (2006)
Dolla Morte (2006)
Assmonster: The Making of a Horror Movie (2006)
Spooked (2007)
Frankenstein The Rapist (2008)
Forgive Me for Raping You (2008)
Zombiechrist (2010)
Antfarm Dickhole (2011)
Indie Director (2013)
Dickshark (2016)

References

External links
Bill Zebub Productions official website
The Grimoire of Exalted Deeds website

People from Passaic County, New Jersey
Living people
Year of birth missing (living people)
American filmmakers
American radio DJs
Critics of religions